Mohamed ben Issa or al-Hadi ben Issa (also nicknamed Sheikh al-Kamil ; 1467–1526) was a Moroccan Wali and founder of the Triqa Issawiya. He is considered the patron-saint of the city of Meknes.

His Tariqa has found many followers outside his native region, and today has outposts throughout Morocco, Algeria, Tunisia, Libya and Egypt.

A hagiography was done by 18th-century Moroccan historian Ahmed ibn al-Mahdi al-Ghazzal in his book an-Nour al-Shamil.

Life
He originated from semlala a clan of the jazula or gzoula tribe in southern Morocco and may have been a descent of the jazulah of the awlad Abu siba, a saharawi tribe in southern Morocco who can trace their linage Idriss II idriss al azhar as the book nour al shamil from Ahmad al ghazali states

As his father was a follower of Imam al-Jazuli, he was born in the region of Safi amongst the Mukhatar clan of the Shaym tribe and travelled as a youngster with his father to Fes

Descendants
One of his grandsons has a mausoleum in Jamat Shaim, where it is referred to locally as Sidi Issa ben Makhlouf.

References

People from Meknes
Moroccan religious leaders
Moroccan Sufis
1467 births
1526 deaths
15th-century Moroccan people
16th-century Moroccan people
People from Safi, Morocco
Berber Muslims
15th-century Berber people
16th-century Berber people